Hollywood Gaming at Mahoning Valley Race Course, is a thoroughbred racino in Austintown, Ohio. It is owned by Gaming and Leisure Properties and operated by Penn Entertainment.

History

Construction on Mahoning Valley Race Course, located on Ohio Route 46, began on May 30, 2013. Mahoning Valley Race Course opened on September 17, 2014. The facility features a one-mile dirt course with grandstand, and a gaming area that displays nearly 1,000 video lottery terminals.

The track replaces Beulah Park Racetrack in Columbus, Ohio. Racing operations at Mahoning Valley began on November 24, 2014.

Physical Attributes

The track features a one-mile oval racetrack over which the thoroughbreds race. The track is 80 feet wide, and is banked at 3% in the stretches and 6% in the turns. The stretch run is 1,000 feet long.

There are two (2) main wagering areas – 1st floor, and the Simulcast Teletheater on the 2nd Floor. Wagering machines are available on both levels.

The backstretch consists of 13 barns with stabling for up to 988 horses, and a receiving barn which has 54 stalls. The receiving barn is used by horses that will be coming in the day of the race from another track or farm to race. Dormitories are available for employees of the horse trainers, the building has 84 rooms that can house 2 (two) people in each room, capacity of 168. There is no charge to horsemen for barn stall space but they will be charged for the dormitory space. The dormitory will have a lounge and vending machines available for horseman.

Racing

In its second season of racing, Mahoning Valley Racecourse has seen gains in both wagering and overnight purses. In March, 2015, overnight purses raised by 5%. The average daily purse at the end of the 2015 winter/spring meet was $76,000. Prior to the second racing season, officials at Mahoning Valley announced another purse increase, during the 2015-16 meet, overnight purses averaged more than $106,000. This number competes aggressively with both Thistledown Racino in nearby North Randall and Mountaineer Racetrack in nearby West Virginia. MVRC announced at the end of 2017 a 5-7% purse increase. Purses for maiden special weights increased from $21,000 to $22,100 and allowance races will be as high as $29,000.

During the 2015-16 racing season, Mahoning Valley Racecourse announced two open stakes races added to its stakes schedule. The $200,000 Steel Valley Sprint Stakes, a six-furlong dash for 3-year-old horses, became the tracks signature race. At the conclusion of the 2018 spring meet, the track announced a $50,00 increase in the sprint, making the total purse $250,000. The $75,000 Hollywood Gaming Mahoning Distaff, also a six-furlong dash, was also added. These two races become part of a 23-race, $5.35 million Penn Gaming Racing Challenge.

Notable Jockey's who have ridden at Mahoning Valley include Corey Lanerie, Florent Geroux, Irad Ortiz, Jr., Trevor McCarthy, Ricardo Santana, Jr., Jose Valdivia Jr., Paco Lopez, Channing Hill, Javier Castellano and Deshawn Parker.

Now entering its fourth live-racing season, Hollywood Gaming Mahoning Valley Racecourse's thoroughbred horses run on Mondays, Tuesdays, Wednesdays with post times of 12:45 P.M. EST and Saturdays with a post time of 12:15 P.M. EST, from late October to late April.

Stakes Schedule

The 2021 racing schedule features 17 stakes races, three (3) open stakes and ten (10) Ohio State bred stakes races. Also in 2016, Mahoning Valley Racecourse will host the Best of Ohio Day featuring four (4) Ohio bred stakes races.

Open Stakes Races
 $250,000 Steel Valley Sprint
 $75,000 Hollywood Gaming Mahoning Distaff
 $75,000 Austintown Filly Sprint

Ohio Bred Stakes Races 
 $75,000 Ohio Debutante Handicap 
 $75,000 The Cardinal Handicap
 $75,000 The First Lady Stakes 
 $75,000 The Glacial Princess Stakes
 $75,000 The Ruff/Kirchberg Memorial Handicap
 $75,000 The Joshua S. Radosevich Memorial-Ohio Freshman Stakes
 $75,000 The Bobbie Bricker Memorial Handicap 
 $75,000 The Southern Park Stakes 
 $75,000 The Howard B. Noonan Stakes

Best of Ohio Day
 $100,000 The Best of Ohio Distaff Stakes
 $100,000 The Best of Ohio Endurance Stakes
 $100,000 The Best of Ohio Sprint Stakes
 $100,000 The Best of Ohio Juvenile Stakes
 $100,000 The Best of Ohio John Galbreath Memorial Stakes

See also
List of casinos in Ohio

References

External links

Horse racing venues in Ohio
Casinos in Ohio